Marco Simiani (born 25 April 1970) is an Italian politician who has served as a Deputy since 13 October 2022.

References

1970 births
Democratic Party (Italy) politicians
Deputies of Legislature XIX of Italy
Politicians from Grosseto
Living people